Leeds Clergy School was a theological college of the Church of England which was founded in 1876 and closed in 1925.  It was established by the Rev. John Gott, Vicar of Leeds and later Bishop of Truro, with the first principal being E C S Gibson, Lecturer at Leeds Parish Church. The school started with just six students, initially catering for those graduates who were aiming to obtain town curacies. It soon grew rapidly up to a maximum of twenty-four.

The students lived initially at Clarendon House, although they moved later to Woodsley House on Clarendon Road, overlooking the city, where the new Fowler Memorial Chapel was added and dedicated on 28 June 1896. This chapel commemorated a former principal. The governors very reluctantly decided to close the school in 1925, after its existing principal accepted a new academic appointment at Reading.

The former buildings, now known as Fairbairn House, eventually passed to the University of Leeds and after previous use as hall of residence have since become a conference centre.  They have also been used as a YMCA hostel.

A few of the college archives are now held by the Thoresby Society in Leeds.

Principals

 1876–1880: Edgar Charles Sumner Gibson (formerly Vice-Principal of Wells Theological College)
 1880–1883: William Methven Gordon Ducat
 1883–1887: Arthur John Worlledge 
 1887-1891: George Herbert Fowler (died 1891)
 : Cosmo Gordon Lang (acting principal) 
 1891–1900: Winfrid Oldfield Burrows
 1900–1910: James Gilliland Simpson
 1910–1919: Richard Henry Malden
 1920–1925: John Kenneth Mozley

Other former staff and students
 Roland Allen, missionary 
 Maurice Harland, Bishop of Durham
 William Foxley Norris, Dean of York and Dean of Westminster
 Maurice Edwards, Chaplain-in-Chief of the Royal Air Force

References

Bible colleges, seminaries and theological colleges in England
Education in Leeds
Former theological colleges in England
Educational institutions established in 1876
1925 disestablishments in England
1876 establishments in England